Emamzadeh Baqer (also Romanized as Emāmzādeh Bāqer) is a village in Salehabad Rural District of Golestan District of Baharestan County, Tehran province, Iran. At the 2006 National Census, its population was 722 in 173 households, when it was Robat Karim County. The following census in 2011 counted 983 people in 275 households, by which time the district, together with Bostan District, had been separated from the county and Baharestan County established. The latest census in 2016 showed a population of 1,134 people in 350 households; it was the only village in its rural district.

References 

Baharestan County

Populated places in Tehran Province

Populated places in Baharestan County